Pine City High School is a six-year public high school located in Pine City, Minnesota, United States. Pine City is a fourth-tier suburb (exurb) of Minneapolis. The school was founded in 1910 and has a current enrollment of approximately 800 students, making it the largest school in Pine County. The nickname for the school's athletic teams is the Dragons.

History
Pine City High School was established in 1910, although the first graduating class from what is now Pine City High School was June 1, 1903, (the newly constructed Webster School).  When the school was first built, many children who lived outside the city of Pine City attended local country schools and then in their later grades attended PCHS.

Extracurricular
Pine City is noted for its strong tradition in the fine and performing arts, and in 2010, 2011, and 2012 was named to the NAMM Foundation's list of "Best Communities for Music Education in America". Both the Concert Band and Concert Choir consistently receive Superior ratings at Large Group Contests and several All-State Band and Choir students have been selected from Pine City music ensembles in recent years. The One-Act Play won its Sub-Section in 2009 with All in the Timing and in 2010 with The Exonerated; in 2011 it placed second in the Section Finals (out of 18) with The Arkansaw Bear and third in 2012 with slasreveR neveS. The Speech Team is the 2009, 2010, 2011 and 2012 Two Rivers Conference Champions. Extra-curricular activities include:
 
Fall Play
German Club
Jazz Band
National Honor Society
One Act Play
Pep Band
Spanish Club
Speech
Student Council
Yearbook Production
Fall Musical and Musical Revue
Band
Choir
Pine City Singers Chamber Choir

Athletics
 
Fall
Football
Girls Tennis
Volleyball
Cross Country
Cheerleading
Winter
Boys Basketball
Girls Basketball
Wrestling (a co-op with Hinckley-Finlayson and East Central High School)
 Gymnastics (a co-op with Rush City and Hinckley-Finlayson)
Boys Hockey (a co-op with Rush City and Hinckley-Finlayson)
Girls Hockey (a co-op with Cambridge-Isanti and Mora)
Cheerleading 
Spring
Boys Tennis
Softball
Baseball
Golf
Track and Field (2011 Class A 4x100M relay State Champions)

Notable alumni

 Ryan Anderson – (1999) musher
 Ben Boo – (1943) politician, former mayor of Duluth, Minnesota
 Jenna Jambeck – (1992) researcher
 Otto Kuss – (1929) professional wrestler 
 Trent Laugerman – (2003) drummer for Vanilla Ice
 Karla Nelsen – (1983) bodybuilder; 1993 AAU Ms. America
 Jason Rarick – (1988) politician
 Allison Rosati – (1981), reporter WMAQ-TV
 Jon Rydberg – (1996), paralympian

References

External links
 Pine City High School website
 SchoolTree Statistics

1910 establishments in Minnesota
Educational institutions established in 1910
Public high schools in Minnesota
Public middle schools in Minnesota
Schools in Pine County, Minnesota